Éva Erdős (born 28 July 1964 in Budapest) is a Hungarian handball player who competed in the 1996 Summer Olympics and won the bronze medal with the Hungarian team. She played four matches and scored six goals.

Awards
 Nemzeti Bajnokság I Top Scorer: 1990

References

1964 births
Living people
Hungarian female handball players
Olympic handball players of Hungary
Handball players at the 1996 Summer Olympics
Olympic bronze medalists for Hungary
Olympic medalists in handball
Medalists at the 1996 Summer Olympics
Handball players from Budapest